Sainte-Félicité may refer to:
Sainte-Félicité, Bas-Saint-Laurent, Quebec, a municipality in Quebec
Sainte-Félicité, Chaudière-Appalaches, Quebec a municipality in Quebec

See also
Montagny-Sainte-Félicité, a village in France